Adolescent sexuality has been a topic observed and studied within the United Kingdom throughout the 20th century and in the 21st century. Associated organisations have been established to study and monitor trends and statistics as well as provide support and guidance to adolescents.

Sexual activity and contraception use
The Family Planning Association, was set up in the 1930s. In 1952 it began to offer contraceptive advice to single women who were just about to wed.

A study in Manchester revealed that between the years 1937 and 1954, almost a quarter of under-age girls coming to the attention of one female police officer regarding underage sex were pregnant. It was also noted that the girls often came from backgrounds of broken homes or bad parental influence. It was found that they also tended to have a lower than average IQ.

The combined oral contraceptive pill became available in 1961, though initially only to married women. The proportion of teenage women who were married rose from 5% in 1951 to 8% in 1961. In the same year, a study of Scottish women found that almost a quarter of single women were sexually experienced before their 20th birthday, the proportion having risen from 6% during the late 1940s and 15% during the late 1950s. The findings of the study concluded that there was a clear increase in sexual intercourse among young single women after the advent of the contraceptive pill in 1961.

The first comprehensive survey of sexual behaviour in United Kingdom amongst unmarried teenagers was conducted in 1964. It revealed that a third of boys and almost one in six girls were sexually experienced by the age of 18, as well as one in twenty girls under 16 being sexually active. It also estimated that around one in three teenage girls who engaged in premarital sexual intercourse fell pregnant. Also revealed in the survey was that one in five of sexually experienced girls and two-fifths of sexually experienced boys always used birth control, the most common form of birth control being the condom (selected by around 80% of those using birth control).

In 1964, Helen Brook set up the Brook Advisory Centres, offering contraceptive advice to young single people under the age of 25. In 1967, a change in the law allowed local health authorities to offer contraceptive services to unmarried people if they so wished, though by 1968 only one in six authorities were providing such a service. Mr K. Robinson, answering a question in the House of Commons regarding the new Family Planning Act in October 1967, stated that it would be unwise to exclude girls under 16 from receiving advice at family planning clinics (FPC), though these girls would only be seen at FPCs in exceptional circumstances even with parental consent.

By 1969, Brook Advisory Centres were offering contraceptive advice to over ten thousand unmarried people under 25, the majority aged between 19 and 21, with around one in six being under 19. In 1970, The Family Planning Association were mandated to offer contraception to unmarried people. In 1971, a survey of Scottish single female students revealed that a third had had sexual intercourse by the age of 18, with over half not using any form of contraception. The survey also showed that one in seven girls who had recently been sexually active had had a partner who was a casual boyfriend.

In 1971, a doctor was reported for informing the parents of a 16-year-old girl that she had come to him seeking contraception. This prompted the British Medical Association to advise doctors to maintain young patients' confidentiality when seeking contraception. Three-quarters of teenagers visiting Brook Advisory Centres during the early 1970s were doing so without their parents' knowledge.

Controversy was also sparked when a 12-year-old girl who had recently undergone an abortion was put on the contraceptive pill with her parents' consent by gynecologist Dr Mary Wilson at Calthorpe nursing home in Birmingham. She said "so many girls come back pregnant again after three or four months, that is why I gave her a supply of the pill and contraceptive advice". Labour MP Leo Abse was concerned that the prescribing of the pill to a 12-year-old child was an offence under the sexual offences act.

In 1975, under the new National Health Service reorganisation act, contraception was made available free of charge to everyone, including single people and those aged under 16. Clarification was given to doctors that they could provide contraception to patients under 16 without parental consent in certain circumstances. The average age of first sexual intercourse for girls had now dropped from 21 in the mid-1950s to 18. Over a quarter of boys under 16 and almost one in eight girls under 16 were sexually experienced.

A report by the British Pregnancy Advisory Service in 1976 found that 69 percent of girls under 16 who came to them for an abortion during the year had used no contraception. Most of them were experienced at sex. By 1978 Brook Advisory Centres were government funded and 3% of Brook's clients were under the age of 16.

In 1980, the 1974 DHSS circular about parental consent and the issuing of contraception/abortion advice to girls under 16 was reviewed. The conclusion was that a doctor or a professional worker should always seek to persuade the child to involve her parents or guardian at the earliest stage of consultation; but it was accepted that occasionally contraception would be given without parental consent.

The number of girls under 16 visiting family planning clinics in England reached over seventeen thousand in 1983, but cuts in health service expenditure forced the closure of many family planning clinics and a restriction in the services available to young people that year.

In 1984, a high court ruling in favour of Victoria Gillick, it was deemed illegal for health professionals to advise or give girls under 16 contraceptives without parental consent except in exceptional circumstances; the number of girls under 16 visiting family planning clinics each year dropped to twelve thousand in response. When the House of Lords overturned the high court ruling in 1985 and confidential contraceptive advice to young people was restored, the number rose again to sixteen thousand per year.

In the first sex survey of its kind, the National Survey of Sexual Attitudes and Lifestyles (NATSAL) in 1991 revealed that one in six girls under 16 and a quarter of boys under 16 were sexually experienced. A fifth of sexually active 16- and 17-year-olds and over half of 18- and 19-year-olds were using at least one method of contraception. The second NATSAL in 2001 showed that the average age of first intercourse had dropped from 17 in the 1980s to 16. It also revealed that a quarter of girls and nearly a third of boys were sexually experienced before the age of 16.

A survey conducted in 2005 found that the number of girls under 16 visiting family planning clinics had risen throughout the 1990s to peak at over ninety-one thousand in 2003, before falling to eighty-three thousand. The most popular choice was the condom with over half choosing this method of contraceptive.

Sexually transmitted infections
The proportion of patients visiting sexual health clinics for treatment of venereal disease, particularly the sexually transmitted infection gonorrhoea, has shown a general increase over the years.

For women, the figures from a study in Manchester showed teenagers accounted for 10% of patients in 1939, up to 23% in 1954. Later studies show figures of 23% in 1957, 27% in 1963, and 33% in 1981. The rate of new cases of gonorrhoea diagnosed at sexual health clinics amongst girls under 16 in England increased more than threefold from 2.76 per hundred thousand of the population in 1966 to 9.38 in 1976.

In men, the proportion of patients at sexual health clinics who were under the age of 20 rose from 3.8% in 1939 to 4.8% in 1954. Amongst boys under 16 the rate of gonorrhoea diagnoses rose from 0.94 per hundred thousand of the population in 1966 to 2.19 in 1976.

In 1971 the number of teenagers visiting sexual health clinics with gonorrhoea reached over ten thousand, 60% were girls and one in twenty were under 16. The number of persons under 16 being diagnosed with gonorrhoea in England fell from 637 in 1976 to 361 in 1981, but the levels rose again and in 1996 there were over ten thousand new cases of gonorrhoea to teenagers reported in sexual health clinics, up over 30% from 1995. In a study in 2005 this number had fallen to 3,700.

Levels of chlamydia in teenagers rose throughout the 1980s and 1990s; in 1996 the levels increased by over 16% from the previous year, and by 2005 it was the most common sexually transmitted infection amongst teenagers with over thirty thousand new cases reported, almost 28% of all new cases. In 2006 a screening programme of young people by the Department of Health revealed that 12% of girls aged 16–19 and 13% of men aged 20–24 were infected with chlamydia.

See also 
 Adolescent sexuality
 Age of consent reform in the United Kingdom
 Ages of consent in Europe
 Teenage pregnancy in the United Kingdom

References

 
Youth in the United Kingdom
Sexuality in the United Kingdom